Claude Dolbert (1902–1967) was a French film producer and occasional screenwriter. He was married to the actress Hélène Pépée who appeared in several films he produced.

Selected filmography
 The Club of Aristocrats (1937)
 The West (1938)
 Miquette (1940)
 Mandrin (1947)
 The Barber of Seville (1948)
 Dark Sunday (1948)
 The Secret of Monte Cristo (1948)
 The Woman I Murdered (1948)
Woman Without a Past (1948)
 The Secret of Mayerling (1949)
 The Red Angel (1949)
 Gigi (1949)
 Sending of Flowers (1950)
 Maria of the End of the World (1951)
 The Strange Madame X (1951)
 Mammy (1951)
 Les insoumises (1956)

References

Bibliography
 Goble, Alan. The Complete Index to Literary Sources in Film. Walter de Gruyter, 1999.

External links

1902 births
1967 deaths
French film producers
Film people from Paris
20th-century French screenwriters